HD 205877 is a visual binary star system in the constellation Indus. It also a double lined spectroscopic binary. The components are very similar and both are located on the giant branch in the Hertzsprung–Russell diagram in agreement with the F7III spectral type.

Stellar system
The visual binary nature of HD 205877 was discovered by the Hipparcos spacecraft and given the double star discoverer designation HDS 3084. The preliminary orbital elements of the system were determined with speckle interferometric measurements made at the 4.1 m Southern Astrophysical Research Telescope in Chile.

References

Indus (constellation)
205877
106978
8269
Binary stars
F-type giants